Al-Mansouriya Sport Club, is an Iraqi football team based in Diyala, that plays in Iraq Division Three.

Managerial history
 Mohammed Zaidan

See also 
 2020–21 Iraq FA Cup
 2021–22 Iraq FA Cup

References

External links
 Al-Mansouriya SC on Goalzz.com
 Iraq Clubs- Foundation Dates

2019 establishments in Iraq
Association football clubs established in 2019
Football clubs in Diyala